World Billiards Championship may refer to:

UMB World Three-cushion Championship, a professional tournament in the carom billiards discipline of three-cushion billiards
World Billiards Championship (English billiards), a professional tournament in the game of English billiards
IBSF World Billiards Championship, an amateur tournament in English billiards